Ashira may refer to:

Ashira (band), Israeli Jewish rock band
Ashira, Bari, village in Bari，Somalia
Evans Ashira (born 1969), Kenyan boxer

See also
Bu Ashira, neighborhood of Manama, Bahrain